Oksana Krechunyak (born 25 April 1981) is a Paralympian athlete from Ukraine competing mainly in category T37 sprint events.

Oksana has twice competed in the Paralympics, in 2004 and 2008, on both occasions competing in the 100m and 200m.  She won the 100m gold medal in 2004.

References

Paralympic athletes of Ukraine
Athletes (track and field) at the 2004 Summer Paralympics
Athletes (track and field) at the 2008 Summer Paralympics
Athletes (track and field) at the 2012 Summer Paralympics
Paralympic gold medalists for Ukraine
Living people
1981 births
Medalists at the 2004 Summer Paralympics
Paralympic medalists in athletics (track and field)
Ukrainian female sprinters
Recipients of the Honorary Diploma of the Cabinet of Ministers of Ukraine
20th-century Ukrainian women
21st-century Ukrainian women